The Phandar is a traditional Vainakhish three-string plucked instrument from Chechnya and Ingushetia  in the Northern Caucasus. 
The sound produced by the Phandar is similar to the Panduri, but it is easy to hear the difference between these two similar instruments.

Vainakhish Phandar
Phandar is the most popular and commonly used string folk instrument in Chechnya and Ingushetia.

Construction

Phandars have a wooden elongated body, carved from one piece of wood, with a flat top and a curved lower deck. They are traditionally made of walnut wood.

Traditional phandar's frets were made of cord or gut string, but modern versions can be made using the same plastic or steel frets used for guitars and other modern fretted instruments.

Phandar are customarily 750–900 mm long, end-to-end, but can vary in size depending on the maker. Originally phanders had 3 separate strings, but some modern instruments have 6 strings in 3 double-courses. Modern phandars are strung with steel strings, but other materials, such as gut strings, may have been used in the past. Three string phandars are tuned c–d–g′, and double-strung phanders are tuned cc–dd–gg′.

Tuning
Three-stringed Phondar: c–d–g'
Six-stringed Phondar: cc–dd–gg'

Related instruments
Related or similar instruments in other Caucasian countries: 
Georgia - Panduri 
Ossetia - Dala-Fandyr 
Dagestan - Tamur-Pandur 
Adygea - Apa-Pshina

See also
 Pandura
 Panduri
 Baglamas
 Bouzouki
 Dombra
 Dutar

References

Chechen musical instruments
String instruments